The Eparchy of Akhaltsikhe and Tao-Klarjeti is an eparchy (diocese) of the Georgian Orthodox Church with its seat in Akhaltsikhe, Georgia. It has jurisdiction over Akhaltsikhe, Adigeni, Aspindza municipalities in Georgia and historical region of Tao-Klarjeti, currently part of Turkey.

Heads

See also
Georgian Orthodox Church in Turkey

References

External links
 ახალციხისა და ტაო-კლარჯეთის ეპარქია
 ახალციხისა და ტაო-კლარჯეთის ეპარქია

Religious sees of the Georgian Orthodox Church
Georgian Orthodox Church in Turkey
Dioceses established in the 20th century
Eastern Orthodox dioceses in Turkey